The Roman Dam of Belas is a 3rd-century Roman barrier constructed to serve the city of Olisipo, located in civil parish of Queluz e Belas, municipality of Sintra (in the Portuguese district of Lisbon).

History
The dam was constructed in the 3rd century, although it is unclear when it was abandoned.

In 1571, Francisco de Holanda first identified the dam and fountains constructed in Lisbon (in Da Fábrica que falece a citada de Lisboa). Holanda, an exponent of the Portuguese Renaissance, painter and humanist, designed the dam and the fountains that were built in the Portuguese capital, then suggesting that they be reused to bring water to the city. This was typical of the posture of someone who had interned in Rome, promoted by the policies of King John III (1502–1557), that contemplated his cultural scholarship in Europe. During this period, Holanda was motivated by the rediscovery and elevation of the classical antiquity, whose testaments in Italy had influenced the principal courts of Europe.

In a regal letter (dated 1573) King Sebastian recommended that they conclude whatever steps were necessary to bring water to Lisbon, but little was concluded.

In 1619, King Philip III of Spain visited the old dam with the intention of promoting its reconstruction, under the direction of Leonardo Turriano. Within the year there was a letter from Madrid with report and four projects established to bring water to Lisbon, with the best being the Roman aqueduct. Taxes were established in order to cost the public works, but in 1623, a letter  determined that the taxes would be used to assist overseas Indian territories.

In 1728, construction began on a new aqueduct that devastated part of the Roman in the area of "crags" because the dam was seen as unnecessary, given the abundance of possible sources of capture in the basin. The smaller buildings erected there, the ventilators are still maintained by the Companhia das Águas de Lisboa.

The construction of the Caneças-Lisbon roadway resulted in the destruction and burial of another wall of the dam.

Architecture

It extends in the local occupied by roadway and the other end to the lateral of the valley, where a great part of the wall was destroyed. The channel from the structure extends  and is visible as it still intersects the more modern Águas Livres Aqueduct that was built over the old structures.

See also 
 List of Roman dams
 Roman Dam of Pego da Moura

References

Notes

Sources

External links 
 Barrages romains du Portugal (no. 25)  

Ancient Roman buildings and structures in Portugal
Belas
Buildings and structures in Lisbon District
Roman Dam Belas